Johann Philipp Jeningen (5 January 1642 – 8 February 1704) was a German Roman Catholic priest from Eichstätt in Bavaria. He served as a popular missionary at the shrine of Our Lady of Schönenberg and attracted many pilgrims from across the globe.

Life
Johann Philipp Jeningen was born in 1642. He entered the Society of Jesus on 19 January 1663 and became a successful popular missionary. 

He served at the shrine of Our Lady of Schönenberg, near Ellwangen in Swabia, which had been made famous by the Jesuits. Jeningen, through the renown of his personal holiness, drew pilgrims from near and far. For many years he went forth on missions in the entire neighbouring country. He conducted about fifty missions annually from Ellwangen.

He died in 1704 and is remembered as the "Apostle of the Ries".

Beatification process
The cause of sainthood started on 23 March 1945 and was held on a local level. The Positio - which documented his life of heroic virtue - was sent to the Congregation for the Causes of Saints in 1983 and resulted in Pope John Paul II proclaiming him to be Venerable on 21 December 1989.

A miracle attributed to them was investigated on a local level from 7 November 2011 until 10 May 2013.

References

This article incorporates text from the 1913 Catholic Encyclopedia article "Ven. Philipp Jeningen" by Anthony Huonder, a publication now in the public domain.

1642 births
1704 deaths
People from Eichstätt (district)
17th-century German Jesuits
18th-century German Jesuits
17th-century venerated Christians
18th-century venerated Christians
Venerated Catholics by Pope John Paul II
Beatifications by Pope Francis